Pani, Burkina Faso is a village in the Pompoï Department of Balé Province in southern Burkina Faso. The village has a total population of 158.

References

Populated places in the Boucle du Mouhoun Region
Balé Province